Malung-Sälen Municipality (Malung-Sälens kommun) is a municipality in Dalarna County in central Sweden. Its seat is located in the town of Malung.

Malung Municipality was created in 1971 by the amalgamation of "old" Malung with the adjacent entities Lima and Transtrand. In 2007 the Government of Sweden decided to approve the present name, which took effect on January 1, 2008. The reason for the double name, the only of its kind in Sweden, is to promote the skiing resort area Sälen in the northern part of the municipality.

Geography

The terrain in the area is largely submontane, with plenty of bog and forest. The Transtrandsfjällen in the north are the southernmost mountains in Sweden, marking the start of the Scandinavian mountain range. Rocks are mostly metamorphic and sedimentary, with occurrences of basalt. Most settlements are located in and around the valley of Västerdalälven river.

Localities

The municipal population was around 13,000 in the 1960s, but has decreased continually since then.

The villages in the municipality, with population figures from 2005, are:
 Lima (418)
 Limedsforsen (443)
 Malung (seat)  (5,146)
 Malungsfors (559)
 Sälen (508) - Is a nationally renowned skiing resort.
 Transtrand (373)
 Yttermalung (216)
 Öje (202) (population figure from 2000)

Riksdag elections

Education
Malung has a folk high school, specialised in folk music and folk dance. One notable former music student is Emma Härdelin.

See also
Scandinavian Mountains Airport

References

External links

Malung-Sälen Municipality – Official site
Jonell-Ericsson, Britta (1987), Skinnare i Malung
Hotell & Konferens Skinnargården in the centre of Malung

Municipalities of Dalarna County